The Clarion is the official student newspaper of the University of Denver. It serves as the voice of the Pioneers. Founded in 1899, the DU Clarion is a student publication at the University of Denver. 1,000 printed copies are distributed every Wednesday with the online version debuting the previous morning.

The paper is printed on recycled newsprint containing post-consumer waste.

Topics
The Clarion covers stories happening on the University of Denver's campus, and local stories happening in Colorado in sections such as News, Opinions, Sports and Arts & Life.

Other coverage
The Clarion is active on multiple social media platforms, including Twitter, Facebook, Instagram and Snapchat.

Although the DU Clarion has covered many controversial topics throughout the duration of its presence on the DU campus, coverage by outside sources has been somewhat limited. However, some stories have received attention from beyond the university’s campus.

On January 12, 2010, an article titled "Seven women you meet at DU" was published in the opinion section of the Clarion. The article sparked much debate. The article itself was eventually removed from the website and created enough buzz to generate a petition.

The DU Clarion also published coverage of the first Presidential Debate of 2012, which was hosted at the university's Magness Arena.

During the 2018-2019 school year, The Clarion began the "Driscoll Green Cannabis Column," where writers can publish articles related to cannabis. It is one of the few college newspapers to feature a column on cannabis.

References

External links 
 

University of Denver